William Henry Grenfell, 1st Baron Desborough,  (30 October 1855 – 9 January 1945) was a British athlete, sportsman, public servant and politician. He sat in the House of Commons first for the Liberal Party and then for the Conservatives between 1880 and 1905 when he was raised to the peerage. He also was President of the Thames Conservancy Board for thirty-two years.

Background and education
Grenfell was the son of Charles William Grenfell, former  MP for Sandwich, and Georgiana Lascelles, daughter of William Saunders Lascelles, MP. He was the nephew of Henry Riversdale Grenfell, the banker and politician, and the first cousin of Edward Grenfell, 1st Baron St Just. Grenfell was educated at Harrow School and Balliol College, Oxford.

Athletic career
Grenfell rowed for Oxford in the Boat Race, in the only dead heat race, in 1877, and Oxford's win of 1878. He was President of the Oxford University Boat Club in 1879. He won the silver medal for fencing in the event of team épée at the 1906 Intercalated Games, having been the first person to carry the flag for Great Britain in the parade of nations. In 1908, he was president of the Olympic games held in London. He also served as the president of the Athletic Club and of the Bartitsu Club. He was also the first ever captain of Maidenhead Rowing Club.

He enjoyed mountaineering, swimming, fishing and big-game hunting. He swam the Niagara rapids twice, climbed the Matterhorn three times, rowed across the English Channel and was amateur punting champion of the Upper Thames. He was President of the Amateur Fencing Association, Marylebone Cricket Club based at Lords, and the Lawn Tennis Association based at Wimbledon. A registered tennis players golf tournament survives in his name since 1912 with its top prize being The Desborough Cup.

He was also a founder member of Maidenhead Golf Club in Berkshire, formed in 1896. It was the friendship of one local founder member, Dr G E Moore, with Grenfell which really got the project off the ground. Grenfell was the Mayor of Maidenhead in 1895 and 1896 and an extremely wealthy and competent businessman who owned more than 10,000 acres of land around the town. Grenfell offered to lease some of his acreage near to Maidenhead Railway Station, which was to become Maidenhead Golf Club and remains so well into a second century. Grenfell became one of the earliest 63 members of the club, and its first president and agreed to present “a challenge cup for competition”. This was the Grenfell Cup which is still in yearly competition.

Political career
In the 1880 general election, Grenfell was elected the Member of Parliament for Salisbury; he lost the seat in a ministerial by-election in 1882 but returned in 1885–1886. He was elected MP for Hereford in 1892.  Politically he was a Gladstonian (loyal) Liberal who resigned in 1893 rather than support Gladstone's Second Irish Home Rule Bill.  He returned to the House of Commons in 1900 as a Conservative. On 30 December 1905, Grenfell was raised to the peerage as Baron Desborough, of Taplow in the County of Buckingham, a title that combined the defunct hundred of Desborough and the riverside village in which he lived in Buckinghamshire.

Other public appointments

During a long career dedicated to public service, he was President of the Thames Conservancy Board from 1904 to 1937, the London Chamber of Commerce, and the Royal Agricultural Society, amongst many others.  He was High Steward of Maidenhead, the nearest town to his home at Taplow Court, Taplow in Buckinghamshire. His good deeds for Maidenhead included the donation of an old chalk pit, converted for use as a park, to celebrate the diamond jubilee of Queen Victoria: this park, Grenfell Park, contains many unusual trees, the seeds of which were collected by Lord Desborough as he travelled the world. He was also an active Freemason. He became a steward of Henley Royal Regatta. He was a J.P. for Buckinghamshire and a Deputy Lieutenant for Tower Hamlets. He was appointed High Sheriff of Buckinghamshire in 1889. On 3 Jun 1915, he was appointed a deputy lieutenant of Buckinghamshire. In 1919, he presided over the Desborough Committee which investigated the conditions that led to the crippling London Police Strike of August 1918. Its recommendations resulted in the enactment of the influential Police Act of 1919 which changed the working conditions of the police in London, Liverpool, Manchester, Birmingham and elsewhere.

Desborough was appointed CVO in 1907 and advanced to KCVO in 1908 and GCVO (Knight Grand Cross) in 1925; and in 1928 he was admitted as a Knight of the Order of the Garter. He was a Major of the 1st Battalion, Buckinghamshire Rifle Volunteers from February 1900. In November 1914, he was appointed President of the Central Association of Volunteer Training Corps, a voluntary home defence militia, until it was disbanded in 1920. From 1924 to 1929 he was Captain of the Yeomen of the Guard. Between 1919 and 1929 he was chairman of the Pilgrims of Great Britain. He planned and oversaw the construction of the Desborough Cut, a navigation channel between nearby stretches of the Thames at Walton-on-Thames and Weybridge, which was opened in 1935. The large island created thereby was named Desborough Island.

In 1933 he was one of eleven people involved in the appeal that led to the foundation of the British Trust for Ornithology (BTO), an organisation for the study of birds in the British Isles.

Desborough had the unfortunate distinction of having an obituary prematurely published on 2 December 1920 by The Times, which confused his name with that of Lord Bessborough, who really had died – Desborough died 25 years later at the age of 89.

Family

Lord Desborough married Ethel Fane (27 June 1867 – 28 May 1952), daughter of the Hon. Julian Fane and granddaughter of John Fane, 11th Earl of Westmorland, in 1887. They had three sons and two daughters. His eldest son was the poet Julian Grenfell, who was killed in action in 1915. His second son, Gerald William Grenfell, was also killed about two months after his elder brother. His third son, Ivo George Grenfell, died in 1926 as the result of a car accident. His daughters were Alexandra Imogen Clair Grenfell (Imogen) (1905–1969) and Monica Margaret Grenfell (1893–1973). As all his sons predeceased him, the barony became extinct. The family lived at Taplow Court, where he and his wife hosted gatherings of the elite and aristocratic group, the 'Souls', adjacent on the riverside to Cliveden, which is a slightly grander country estate, but which saw its social heyday immediately after, from 1920 to 1965. Lady Desborough was a well-known celebrity in her day. Margot Asquith, whose husband would later be politically aligned against Desborough, said of her, She tells enough white lies to ice a wedding cake.

In 1892, he built a stické tennis court at the house.

He was the owner of Whiteslea Lodge on the Hickling Estate in Norfolk, close to the Hickling Broad. This was the former shooting lodge of Whiteslea Estate and was extensively improved and added to by Lord Desborough in the 1930s. Its interior featured enormous friezes by bird artist Roland Green.

Desborough College in Maidenhead is named after Lord Desborough.

See also 
 List of Oxford University Boat Race crews

Notes

References

External links

 William Henry Grenfell at Grenfell family history site
 The Forgotten Olympics
 

1855 births
1945 deaths
Liberal Party (UK) MPs for English constituencies
Conservative Party (UK) MPs for English constituencies
Knights of the Garter
Knights Grand Cross of the Royal Victorian Order
Barons in the Peerage of the United Kingdom
People educated at Harrow School
Alumni of Balliol College, Oxford
People from Taplow
People from Maidenhead
Olympic fencers of Great Britain
Fencers at the 1906 Intercalated Games
UK MPs 1880–1885
UK MPs 1885–1886
UK MPs 1900–1906
UK MPs who were granted peerages
Grenfell, William
High Sheriffs of Buckinghamshire
British people of Cornish descent
William
Deputy Lieutenants of Buckinghamshire
Medalists at the 1906 Intercalated Games
Presidents of the Marylebone Cricket Club
British sportsperson-politicians
International Olympic Committee members
People from Hickling, Norfolk
British male fencers
Peers created by Edward VII